Nigel Ian Wallace (born 5 June 1967) is a male British sport shooter.

Sport shooting career
Wallace was the first person as a junior to win the senior British air rifle championship and has held multiple English, British records and won many championships throughout his target shooting career

Wallace competed at three consecutive Commonwealth Games from 1994 until 2002, winning medals at each games.

He represented England and won a bronze medal in the 10 metres air rifle and a silver medal in the pairs with Chris Hector, at the 1994 Commonwealth Games in Victoria, British Columbia, Canada. Four years later he represented England in the same events but this time won a gold medal in the pairs with Hector, at the 1998 Commonwealth Games in Kuala Lumpur, Malaysia. Finally at the 2002 Commonwealth Games in Manchester, he won a bronze medal in the pairs, once again with Hector.

Wallace also represented Great Britain at the 1992 Olympic Games in Barcelona.

Personal life
He was a BT manager by trade.

Retired from BT in 2018 and now is a award winning full time professional dog photographer covering Norfolk, Suffolk and the whole of East Anglia plus the UK.

He has been featured for his brilliant dog photography on numerous BBC and ITV programmes as well as multiple national magazines and newspaper articles and featured in the top selling American Magazine People.com

References

1967 births
Living people
British male sport shooters
Commonwealth Games medallists in shooting
Commonwealth Games gold medallists for England
Commonwealth Games silver medallists for England
Commonwealth Games bronze medallists for England
Shooters at the 1994 Commonwealth Games
Shooters at the 1998 Commonwealth Games
Shooters at the 2002 Commonwealth Games
Olympic shooters of Great Britain
Shooters at the 1992 Summer Olympics
Medallists at the 1994 Commonwealth Games
Medallists at the 1998 Commonwealth Games
Medallists at the 2002 Commonwealth Games